Rumyana Bachvarova (Bulgarian: Румяна Бъчварова) (born on 13 March 1959 in Shipka, Bulgaria) is a Bulgarian GERB politician. Since November 7, 2014 she was Deputy Prime Minister in charge of coalition policy and state administration in the Second Borisov Cabinet. On 11 March 2015, the Minister of Interior Veselin Vuchkov was replaced by Rumyana Bachvarova, who also kept her position as a Deputy PM. She has been credited with being a unifying force when it comes to the different parties supporting the Second Borisov government.

References

Living people
1959 births
People from Stara Zagora Province
Members of the National Assembly (Bulgaria) 
GERB politicians
Bulgarian conservatives
Deputy prime ministers of Bulgaria
Interior ministers of Bulgaria
Women government ministers of Bulgaria
Female interior ministers
21st-century Bulgarian women politicians
21st-century Bulgarian politicians